The Germany–Italy football rivalry between the national football teams of Germany and Italy, the two most successful football nations in Europe, is a long-running one. Overall, the two teams have won eight FIFA World Cup championships (four each) and made a total of 14 appearances in the final of the tournament (eight for Germany and six for Italy)—more than all the other European nations combined.

They have played against each other five times in the World Cup, (Italy having won 3 games, tied two, and never lost) and many of these matches have been notable in the history of the tournament. The "Game of the Century", the 1970 semifinal between the two countries that Italy won 4–3 in extra time, was so dramatic that it is commemorated by a plaque at the entrance of the Estadio Azteca in Mexico City. Germany has also won three European Championships while Italy has won it twice. The two countries have faced each other four times in the European championship, with one Italian victory and three draws (one German penalty shoot-out success).

While Germany has won more international championships, Italy is largely dominant in the head-to-head international match-up, having beaten Germany 15 times in 37 games, with 13 draws and 9 defeats. Moreover, Germany had never won against Italy in an official tournament match, until a June 2022 UEFA Nations League match, with all Germany's other wins over Italy being in friendly competitions—however, Germany had overcome Italy on penalties following a draw after extra time in the quarter-finals of Euro 2016. There were also four matches played between Italy and East Germany which resulted 1 win for each country and 2 draws.

List of matches

Comparison in major tournaments
 Key
 Denotes which team finished better in that particular competition.
DNQ: Did not qualify.
DNP: Did not participate.
TBD: To be determined.

Major encounters

1962 World Cup
This game was the first match ever played in a World Cup between Germany and Italy, and saw few scoring chances for both sides. In the first half Uwe Seeler hit the bar, Albert Brülls and Omar Sívori also had their chances. In the second half the game became more physical and sometimes brutal but in the end defences overcame attacks and no goals were scored.

1970 World Cup

Italy led for the majority of the semi-final match, after Roberto Boninsegna scored in the 8th minute. Germany's Franz Beckenbauer dislocated his shoulder after being fouled, but stayed on the field carrying his dislocated arm in a sling, as his side had already used their two permitted substitutions.

Defender Karl-Heinz Schnellinger equalized for West Germany during injury time at the end of the second half. German television commentator Ernst Huberty exclaimed "Schnellinger, of all people!", since Schnellinger played in Italy's professional football league, Serie A, at A.C. Milan (for whom he rarely scored) and previously for A.S. Roma and A.C. Mantova. It was also his first and only goal in 47 matches for the national team.  The second half ended with the scores deadlocked at 1–1, and at this point the match became a battle of endurance during the two periods of extra time.

Gerd Müller put Germany ahead in the 94th minute, but Tarcisio Burgnich tied it back up four minutes later and Luigi Riva put the Italians back in front. Gerd Müller scored again for West Germany to tie up the score at 3–3. Yet, as television cameras were still replaying Müller's goal, Italy's Gianni Rivera scored the game-winning goal in the 111th minute. Being left unmarked near the penalty area, Rivera connected a fine cross made by Boninsegna, clinching the victory for Italy at 4–3.

1978 World Cup
This match was played in the first matchday of Group A of the 1978 FIFA World Cup, a round robin played between the winners and the runners-up of the groups of the first phase; the game ended in a scoreless draw. At the end of the second phase Italy managed to reach the third place play-off against Brazil, while Germany were eliminated as third in the group.

1982 World Cup

On 11 July, after a scoreless first half during which Antonio Cabrini fired a penalty low and wide to the right of goal, Paolo Rossi scored first, heading home a bouncing Claudio Gentile cross from the right from close range. Marco Tardelli then scored from the edge of the area with a low left footed shot before Alessandro Altobelli, at the end of a counterattack by winger Bruno Conti, made it 3–0 with another low left footed shot. Paul Breitner scored for Germany in the 83rd minute, firing low past the goalkeeper from the right, but Italy held on to claim their first World Cup title in 44 years, and their third in total with a 3–1 victory.

Euro 1988
Both the sides faced-off in the opening match of Euro 1988 in group stage held in West Germany. The first half ended without any goals. Within 10 minutes of the second half Roberto Mancini gave the Italian side the lead by scoring at the 52nd minute, however the lead was short lived as Andreas Brehme scored the equalizer for West Germany at the 55th minute. The game ended in a draw with one goal for each side.

Euro 1996
The two teams were matched up in the final game of the group stage of UEFA Euro 1996. Germany was already guaranteed progress to the next stage unless Italy and Czech Republic both won their matches while Italy was faced with a must-win situation if the Czech Republic did not lose to Russia. Gianfranco Zola had a penalty saved by Andreas Köpke in the 9th minute and Thomas Strunz was sent off in the 59th minute. Despite the man advantage and the lion's share of possession, Italy failed to score due to the heroic display of Köpke. The goalless draw resulted in Italy being eliminated from the tournament as the Czech Republic drew with Russia

2006 World Cup
This was the semi-final match played in Westfalenstadion, Dortmund, in front of a crowd of 65,000 on 4 July 2006. Until then, the Westfalenstadion had been a fortress-like stadium for the Germany national team, as Germany had never lost there in 14 matches. During an eventful match, this record was broken when two late goals in the closing half of extra-time scored by Fabio Grosso and Alessandro Del Piero saw Italy advance to the final. Italy went on to win the World Cup for a fourth time.

German midfielder Torsten Frings was suspended for this match after the media released footage of him throwing a punch at Argentinian player Julio Cruz after a brawl broke out in Germany's quarter-final against Argentina; FIFA announced his suspension one day before the semi-final match.

Euro 2012
Italy met Germany again in the semi-final match of Euro 2012 in the evening of 28 June 2012 at National Stadium in Warsaw. Prior to this match, Germany had set a world football record with 15 consecutive wins in competitive matches, which included all matches of Euro 2012 up to that point and the qualifiers. However, also this record was to be broken by Italy on that day.

In the 20th minute, Italian striker Mario Balotelli scored the first goal for Italy, in the left corner of the net, heading past German goalkeeper Manuel Neuer after receiving a cross from Antonio Cassano, then in the 36th minute, Balotelli scored again for Italy, this time blasted into the top right corner on a one-on-one with Neuer, assisted by a Riccardo Montolivo lob over the German defence, giving them a two-goal lead. In the second half, the Germans attacked, trying to even the score. Italian goalkeeper Gianluigi Buffon made several impressive saves to many German shots. Two minutes into added time, Italian defender Federico Balzaretti committed a handball inside the penalty box. The resulting penalty was successfully converted by the German midfielder Mesut Özil.

Thus, the final score was 2–1 to Italy, who went on to the finals against defending champions Spain. As in their previous encounter in the 2006 World Cup semifinal match, Andrea Pirlo was again elected the man of the match.

Euro 2016
On 2 July 2016, Germany and Italy met at the Nouveau Stade de Bordeaux in Bordeaux during the quarter-finals of the UEFA Euro 2016 where the match ended in a 1–1 draw after extra time, with Germany advancing 6–5 after a penalty shoot-out—statistically a draw, it was the first time ever Germany had overcome Italy in a competitive tie.

Mesut Özil scored in the 65th minute to give Germany the lead. In the 78th minute Leonardo Bonucci scored from the penalty spot after Jérôme Boateng was fouled for a handball in the box. After a goalless extra time period, with the two sides still locked at one goal each, a penalty shoot-out resulted 6–5 in favour of Germany.

Manuel Neuer (Germany) and Gianluigi Buffon (Italy), the goalkeeper-captains of their respective teams for the quarter-final (although Neuer handed the skipper's armband when Bastian Schweinsteiger was substituted in), were the last goalkeepers who had not conceded a goal in the tournament until this match. They received praise for their performances in the quarter final.

Statistics

Overall

Note 1: * Germany overcame Italy in UEFA Euro 2016 quarter-final match via penalty shoot-out.

Note 2: Include matches involving former West Germany.

See also
 Football derbies in Italy
 German football rivalries
 Germany–Italy relations
 List of association football rivalries

References

External links
 List of matches between Italy and Germany at European Football national team matches
Germany-Italy matches 1923-2016 at RSSSF

Germany national football team rivalries
Italy national football team rivalries
International association football rivalries
Germany–Italy relations
West Germany at the 1970 FIFA World Cup
West Germany at the 1982 FIFA World Cup
West Germany at UEFA Euro 1988
Germany at UEFA Euro 1996
Germany at the 2006 FIFA World Cup
Germany at UEFA Euro 2012
Germany at UEFA Euro 2016
Italy at the 1970 FIFA World Cup
Italy at the 1982 FIFA World Cup
Italy at UEFA Euro 1988
Italy at UEFA Euro 1996
Italy at the 2006 FIFA World Cup
Italy at UEFA Euro 2012
Italy at UEFA Euro 2016